Michaela Taupe-Traer (born 25 January 1975 in Klagenfurt) is an Austrian rower. In the lightweight single sculls she won the silver medal at the 2012 World Rowing Championships and gold at the 2013 World Rowing Championships.

References

 

1975 births
Living people
Austrian female rowers
Sportspeople from Klagenfurt
World Rowing Championships medalists for Austria